Ameletus validus is a species of combmouthed minnow mayfly in the family Ameletidae. It is found in southwestern Canada, the western United States, and Alaska.

References

Mayflies
Articles created by Qbugbot
Insects described in 1923